The Leyland L60 was a British  vertical six-cylinder opposed-piston two-stroke multi-fuel diesel engine designed by Leyland Motors in the late 1950s/early 1960s for the Chieftain main battle tank (MBT). The engine was also used in the Vickers MBT and its Indian-built derivative, the Vijayanta.

Development
The initial engine choice in 1954 for what was known at the time as "Medium Gun Tank No.2", later designated the "FV4201" and given the service name 'Chieftain', was a Rolls-Royce diesel V8, however during the Chieftain's design phase NATO introduced a policy in 1957 requiring all armoured fighting vehicles to have a multi-fuel capability. This left the Rolls-Royce engine an unsuitable option and so a new engine with this capability was required. 

Leyland Motors, under the direction of the Fighting Vehicles Research and Development Establishment (FVRDE) at Chertsey, was asked to develop an opposed-piston two-stroke diesel of similar design to those previously produced by Napier and Tilling-Stevens, the latter's Commer TS3 engine being particularly highly regarded.

This configuration, apart from being well-suited to multi-fuel use, also had the advantages of being of simple design with a low parts count, had low bearing loads, and possessed good cold-starting characteristics. Some technical assistance was provided to Leyland by Rolls-Royce, who by that time was a parent to the Napier aero-engine company, Napier itself remained a subsidiary of English Electric. Both Tilling-Stevens and Leyland produced single-cylinder prototype engines for the tank engine project and by 1959 the resulting complete engine design had become the Leyland 60, or L60, with the first engine running that same year.

Overview
One of the reasons the L60's unusual configuration was chosen was so as to obtain as compact a power plant as possible so allowing the height of the vehicle to be kept as low as was practicable, a requirement for the Chieftain's design philosophy which was also seen in the recumbent driver's position.

The use of the two-stroke cycle allowed for a greater power for a given displacement, a 19-litre diesel engine being expected to be capable of around the same power as the 600 hp 27-litre petrol Meteor tank engine  whilst taking up less room in the engine compartment. Scavenging, necessary in a large two-stroke diesel for evacuating the cylinders of exhaust gases, was performed by a Roots blower.

Maintenance
The Chieftain's L60 engine and cooling system were designed into an integrated engine-pack which could be changed "in the field" using the crane of an FV434 Armoured Repair Vehicle, which had been designed for this purpose and a complete engine change took around one-and-a-half, to 2 hours.

The requirement for an easily changeable engine pack was the result of a British Army analysis of previous tank battles that concluded that a likely future tank battle would last no longer than two hours and so the most demanding requirement expected for any tank engine during wartime would be for it to be run at full power for this total amount of time only and so it would then be advantageous for it to be removed from the vehicle after the battle and exchanged for a fresh engine within a minimum of time.

This would also allow the engines to be worked on in properly equipped REME workshops rather than 'in the field', the engines being exchanged between vehicles and workshops as-and-when required. This philosophy was also applied to the contemporary FV430 series of vehicles.

Performance
The initial production L60 units were, at 585 bhp at 2,100 rpm, down on the designed initial power of 600 bhp  and were plagued with reliability problems. These problems were exacerbated during the Chieftain's introduction by initially an inadequate spares stock and an insufficient spare engine 'float' .  The L60 reliability problem would have been far worse had it not been for the removable engine pack, which usually allowed a vehicle to be operational again with a replacement engine within a couple of hours of breaking down. A persistent source of trouble was the failure of the cylinder liner sealing resulting in coolant leakage into the cylinder bore. Fan drive belts overstressed fan bearing housings in the crankcase leading to cracking. Reliability did improve over time with modifications and improvement programmes, such as the "Sundance" programme which also improved power output. Sundance was carried out in five main phases between 1976 and 1979. Sundance had been preceded by "Dark Morn", "High Noon", and the initial "Fleetfoot" engine development programme -the person responsible for the choosing of code names apparently being an admirer of the Western film. The Sundance programme was the subject of parliamentary questions in the House of Commons in 1978. With the final rectification of most of the L60's previous reliability and power problems, vehicle availability levels rose to 80%. In the 1990 Gulf War Chieftain AARV and CHAVRE availability levels exceeded those of the Challenger 1 tank which had by that point replaced Chieftain.

Final production engines produced  following a series of modifications to engines in service under the various improvement programmes.

Initially, due to unfamiliarity with the two-stroke engine's different exhaust note and power band compared to a four-stroke engine, and with the resulting difficulty in choosing the correct gear required for the particular driving task, trainee drivers tended to under-rev the engines and use inappropriate gear selections, leading to great difficulty climbing gradients, and when the Chieftain Mk 1 was first introduced some drivers had difficulty climbing the vehicle onto the trailers of Thornycroft Antar tank transporters.

L60 variants 
Mark 1 - Mark 4,  prototype engines completed 1959 to 1965, 60 built
Mark 4A,  first production variant, January 1965, producing 585 bhp. Used  in Chieftain Mk 1 which were used for training duties at Bovington Camp and Catterick Garrison.
Mark 4A2, Mark 4A with a new piston crown, produced 650 bhp, November 1965
Mark 4B, de-rated Mark 4A2 for Vickers MBT/Vijayanta which was some 17-18 tons lighter than Chieftain. In this vehicle the L60 suffered fewer reliability problems. 540 bhp
Mark 5A, modified piston with oil cell and offset bowl, new sump, pressure-lubricated fan bearings, 650 bhp, introduced in April 1969 for the Chieftain Mk. 3.
Mark 6A, produced October 1970 featuring a two-stage air cleaner, 650 bhp. Fitted to Chieftain Mk. 3(S) « Sandman »
Mark 7A, produced from October 1971, culmination of initial "Fleetfoot" development programme, three-lobe scavenger blower, new cylinder block with re-positioned fan belt deflectors, re-designed liners, new radiators, Belzona sealant used on liner seals, increased power to 720 bhp. For Chieftain Mk. 5, Mk. 3/2 and Mk 3/3.
Mark 8A, two-lobe scavenger blower, commercial version for general sale to customers other than the British Army of Mark 7A, new shot-peened liner material, new pistons, increased power to 750 bhp. Used in Chieftain Mk 5, the last Chieftain production variant. Later Marks were upgrades of existing vehicles.
Mark 9A, June 1977 "Dark Morn" modifications including new liner material, new pistons and piston rings with improved oil cooling, new fan drives, 750 bhp. 
Mark 10A, export version of Mark 9A with two-lobe scavenger blower. Mark 10A engines had additional air cleaning for the desert environment in Iran. 
Mark 11A - Mark 12A, "Sundance" modifications to fix reliability issues, block/liner sealing O-ring retained by interference-fitted liners, new injectors, CAV fuel filters, Poly-V fan drive belts, introduced March 1978, increased power to 750 bhp. Target 4,000-mile engine life achieved by December 1978. 
Mark 11A/N - Mark 12A/N, August 1979 designations for modified Mark 11A and Mark 12A engines using no O-ring on cylinder liners.
Mark 13A - Mark 14A, April 1980 re-designations of Mark 11A/N - Mark 12A/N engines, 750 bhp

In 1975 all British Chieftains were brought up to Chieftain Mark 5 standard as part of the "Totem Pole" programme which included the fitting of all vehicles with the 750 bhp L60 Mark 8A. On undergoing "Totem Pole" upgrades Chieftain Mk 2 vehicles were re-designated the Mark 6. Mk 3 vehicles became the Mk 7, and Mk 3/3 vehicles became the Mk 8.

Transmission
The engine was mated with a Merritt-Brown TN12 triple-differential epicyclic gearbox providing "regenerative" steering, a derivative of the system first used on the Churchill tank. The gearbox was semi-automatic foot-operated and had six forward, and two reverse gears. Like the engine, it was designed to be quickly replaceable. The TN12 had originally been developed for the cancelled FV300 light tank series. A scaled down version of the TN12, the TN15, was used in the CVR(T) series of vehicles.

Use
 Chieftain tank
 Vickers MBT
 Vijayanta

Notes

References 

Engines
Tank engines
Two-stroke diesel engines
Opposed piston engines
British Leyland engines